Aloysius Augustus Wesbecher (November 3, 1892 – March 27, 1966) was a professional American football player for the Cleveland Tigers of the American Professional Football Association, later renamed the National Football League (NFL). Prior to that, he played for the Massillon Tigers in the "Ohio League", which was direct predecessor to the NFL. Wesbecher also played at the college level for the Washington & Jefferson Presidents.

References

External links
 

1892 births
1966 deaths
American football centers
American football tackles
Alfred Saxons football coaches
Cleveland Tigers (NFL) players
Massillon Tigers players
Sportspeople from the Pittsburgh metropolitan area
Washington & Jefferson Presidents football players
People from Greensburg, Pennsylvania
Coaches of American football from Pennsylvania
Players of American football from Pennsylvania